Danielle Ackley-McPhail (born 1970) is an American author and editor, as well as publisher of fiction, and is best known for her work in speculative fiction. She was the editor for the Bad-Ass Faeries, which was a finalist for the Dream Realm Award for best anthology, and her novel Tomorrow's Memories was a finalist for the 2008 Dream Realm Award for best fantasy. Bad-Ass Faeries 3: In All Their Glory won the best anthology at the 2011 EPIC award for best eBook anthology.

She has worked in the publishing business as a production manager at Random House, and Marietta Publishing, an author for Mundania Press, and a promotions manager for Dark Quest.  

As an editor and publisher Danielle has worked on more than thirty novels, and many anthologies, including works by authors Jody Lynn Nye, Keith DeCandido, Bud Sparhawk, James Chambers and L. Jagi Lamplighter.

Danielle is a regular speaker at industry and pop culture conventions, and has appeared as a guest speaker and panelist at Balticon Heliosphere, DerpyCon, DexCon, Shore Leave, Farpoint, Lunacon, the Maryland Faerie Festival, Confluence, and Shikkaricon.

Danielle and her husband Mike McPhail are founders and owners of eSpec Books a small press publisher.

Personal life 
Danielle is the youngest of five siblings. She is a graduate of Kean College and holds bachelor's degrees in both English and Communications. 

Danielle lives in New Jersey with husband and fellow writer, Mike McPhail and four cats.

Bibliography

Novels 
Yesterday's Dreams (2001) by Vivisphere Publishers  Today's Promise (2008) by Mundania Press The Halfling's Court: A Bad-Ass Faerie Tale (2010) by Dark Quest  Tomorrow's Memories (2012) by Dark Quest A Legacy of Stars (2012) by Dark Quest The Redcaps’ Queen 
 Baba Ali and the Clockwork Djinn (2014) by Dark Quest Consigned to the Sea Eternal Wanderings: The Continuing Journey of Kara O'Keefe (2019) by Paper Phoenix Press 

 Short fiction No Longer Dreams: An Anthology of Horror, Fantasy, and Science Fiction (2005) by Lite Circle Books  Hear Them Roar (2006) by Wilder Publications Bad-Ass Faeries (2007) by Mundania Press ISBN Bad-Ass Faeries 2: Just Plain Bad (2009) by Mundania Press  Bad-Ass Faeries 3: In All Their Glory (2010) by Mundania Press In An Iron Cage: The Magic of Steampunk (2011) by Dark Quest Dragon's Lure (Legends of a New Age Book One) (2010) by Dark Quest 
Barbarians at the Jumpgate (2010) by Padwolf Publishing Consigned to the Sea (2014) by Dark Quest The Society for the Preservation of CJ Henderson (2015) by eSpec Books
Were (2016) by Zombies Need Brains 
If We Had Known (Beyond the Cradle Book 1) (2017) by eSpec Books                                                                                                                                                                       
Athena's Daughters, vol. 1: Women in Science Fiction and Fantasy

 Non-fiction The Literary Handyman: Tips on Writing From Someone's Who's Been There (2011) by Dark Quest The Ginger KICK! Cookbook   Paper Phoenix Press, 2018The Complete Guide to Writing the Paranormal Novel (2011) by Dragon Moon Press 
The Complete Guide to Writing Fantasy, Volume 3: The Author's Grimoire  

 As editor Bad-Ass Faeries'' (2007) by Mundania Press ISBN 
The Side of Good / The Side of Evil eSpec Books 
The Clockwork Witch (2018) eSpec Books 
The Best of Defending the Future eSpec Books

References

External links
 Danielle Ackley-McPhail
 

1970 births
Living people
21st-century American novelists
American women novelists
21st-century American women writers
Novelists from New Jersey
Kean University alumni